Brickellia macromera is a rare Mexican  species of flowering plants in the family Asteraceae. It is found only in the state of Baja California Sur in western Mexico.

Brickellia macromera is a branching shrub with white bark on the limbs and trunk. It produces several flower heads with disc florets but no ray florets.

References

macromera
Flora of Baja California Sur
Plants described in 1917